This is a list of notable events in country music that took place in 2020.

Events

COVID-19 
March 16 – The 55th Academy of Country Music Awards, originally scheduled for April 5, was postponed to September 16. A few weeks later, the 2020 CMT Music Awards were pushed back to October 21, from their original date of June 3.
March 20 - The Grand Ole Opry announces it will continue hosting performances, but without a live audience attending in the Ryman Auditorium. 
March 29 – Joe Diffie, a country music superstar who scored many Top Ten hits during the 1990s and early 2000s, dies from complications of COVID-19, two days after announcing he had fallen ill.
March 31 – The Country Music Association announces that the 2020 CMA Fest, scheduled for June 4–7, is officially canceled.
October 7 – Morgan Wallen is dropped as a musical guest by Saturday Night Live after a video of him attending a party without wearing a face mask surfaces. Jack White eventually is called to be the replacement musical guest. 
December 12 – Charley Pride dies from complications of COVID-19 one month after receiving the Willie Nelson Lifetime Achievement Award at the CMA Awards, an event that would turn out to be his final public appearance.

Other
 January 2 – Capitol Records Nashville signs Hot Country Knights, a fictitious band portrayed by Dierks Bentley and members of his road band.
 January 4 – Radio personality Fitz takes over as permanent host of Bob Kingsley's Country Top 40, succeeding the longtime radio host who died in 2019. Affiliates of Fitz's previous programs – The Fitz Show, The Hit List with Fitz, and Nashville Minute with Fitz – were replaced with programs from KCCS Productions, which produces CT40.
January 7 – Rascal Flatts announced that they would be disbanding following a farewell tour after 20 years together. The tour (in addition to several other tours) would later be cancelled due to COVID-19.
March 7 – Jimmie Allen's "Make Me Want To" tops the Billboard Country Airplay chart in its 58th week, setting a record for both the slowest ascent to the top and the longest overall run in that chart's history.
 March 23 – Maren Morris and Ryan Hurd announce the birth of their first child, Hayes Andrew Hurd.
 May 5 – Travis Denning's "After a Few" charts on Country Airplay for the 60th week, breaking the longevity record set on that chart only two months prior. It would later reach the top on June 13 in its 65th week, also setting a record for the longest climb to Number One since the inception of Nielsen Soundscan in 1990.
 May 14–15 – Vocalist Hannah Mulholland quits the group Runaway June and is replaced by Natalie Stovall, formerly of Natalie Stovall and the Drive.
June – Amid the fallout from the George Floyd protests, two groups change their names. On June 11, Lady Antebellum announces their name will change to Lady A, the group's longstanding nickname. On June 25, the Dixie Chicks become known as The Chicks. Both moves were announced amid criticism that the words "Antebellum" and "Dixie" had connotations of American slavery.
June 13 – Hank Williams Jr.'s 27-year-old daughter, Katharine Williams-Dunning, is killed in a car accident in Henry County, Tennessee.
June 19 – Carly Pearce and Michael Ray announce their divorce after less than eight months of marriage.
July 3 – Kacey Musgraves and husband Ruston Kelly divorce after  years of marriage.
July 4 – Kenny Chesney's "Here and Now" becomes his 31st number-one single on the Country Airplay chart, making Chesney the artist with the most number one singles on that chart.
July 17 – The Chicks release their first studio album in 14 years, Gaslighter.
July 29 – Garth Brooks withdraws himself from consideration for the CMA Entertainer of the Year category after seven wins.
August 1 – Luke Combs marries Nicole Hocking in Florida, after 4 years of dating.
August 16 - Singer Gabby Barrett announces her pregnancy with her first daughter with husband Cade Foeher.
August 17 – Taylor Swift marks her return to country music radio in three years with the release of "Betty", off her Folklore album.
August 25 - Singer Mickey Guyton announces her pregnancy for her first child with husband Grant Savoy.
 August 31 - Blanco Brown is involved in a motorcycle accident in which he breaks both arms, both legs, and his pelvis. He undergoes a twelve-hour surgery.
September 16 – For the first time in history, the Academy of Country Music declares a tie for the Entertainer of the year award - Thomas Rhett and Carrie Underwood.
October 27 – Blake Shelton and Gwen Stefani become engaged after 5 years of dating.
November 21 – Jon Pardi marries Summer Duncan in Murfreesboro, Tennessee, after announcing their engagement in October 2019.
November 30 – Jake Owen and Erica Hartlein become engaged after 3 years of dating.

Top hits of the year

The following songs placed within the Top 20 on the Hot Country Songs, Country Airplay, or Canada Country charts in 2020:

Singles released by American and Australian artists

Singles released by Canadian artists

Top new album releases 
The following albums placed on the Top Country Albums charts in 2020:

Other top albums

Deaths
January 15 – Chris Darrow, 75, American musician (Nitty Gritty Dirt Band), complications from a stroke.
January 18 – David Olney, 71, American singer-songwriter, heart attack.
January 29 – Eddie Setser, 77, American songwriter ("Seven Spanish Angels")
February 12 – Paul English, 87, American drummer (Willie Nelson), pneumonia.
March 1 –  Jan Vyčítal, 77, Czech caricaturist and country music singer-songwriter.
March 7 –  Jim Owen, 78, American country singer-songwriter.
March 20 –  Kenny Rogers, 81, American country singer and songwriter who was responsible for having major crossover success in the 1970s and 1980s (natural causes).
March 22 –  Eric Weissberg, 80, American folk musician ("Dueling Banjos", The Tarriers), complications from Alzheimer's disease.
March 28 – Jan Howard, 91,  country music singer and Grand Ole Opry member, natural causes.
March 29 – Joe Diffie, 61, country music singer-songwriter who was responsible for a plethora of hits throughout the '90s and early '00s such as "Pickup Man", "John Deere Green" and "Third Rock from the Sun". (COVID-19)
April 7 – John Prine, 73, American country-folk singer-songwriter. (COVID-19)
 April 15 – Gary McSpadden, 77, American gospel singer, former member of The Oak Ridge Boys.
 April 25 – Harold Reid, 80, member of The Statler Brothers (kidney failure)
 May 11 - Fuzzy Owens, 91, Pioneer Of The Bakersfield Sound, Songwriter & Longtime manager of Merle Haggard
 June 2 – Jimmy Capps, 81, Nashville musician; member of the Grand Ole Opry house band and The Nashville A-Team.
 June 8 – James Hand, 67, American country music singer-songwriter.
 June 12 – Larry W. Johnson, 69, songwriter ("Don't Take the Girl")
 July 3 – Craig J. Martin, 52, songwriter ("Don't Take the Girl") (heart attack)
 July 6 – Charlie Daniels, 83, country music and Southern rock legend best known for "The Devil Went Down to Georgia", "Long Haired Country Boy", "The South's Gonna Do It" and many others. (stroke)
 July 15 - Kenny Dale, 67, American singer (COVID-19)
 July 16 – Jamie Oldaker, 68, American drummer (Eric Clapton, The Tractors).
 July 30 — Randy Barlow, 77, American country singer-songwriter (cancer)
 July 31 — Bill Mack, 91, American country disc jockey and songwriter ("Blue", "Drinking Champagne") (COVID-19)
 August 18 — Steve Gulley, 57, American bluegrass singer-songwriter, pancreatic cancer.
 August 23 — Justin Townes Earle, 38, American singer-songwriter, son of Steve Earle.
 September 11 — Troy Jones, 64, Nashville songwriter (“People Are Crazy”, “Shiftwork”, "Pretty Good at Drinkin' Beer")
 September 21 — Roy Head, 79, American singer-songwriter best known for his 1965 pop hit "Treat Her Right" and charted several country hits in the 1970s and 1980s. (heart attack)
 September 23 — W. S. Holland, 85, American drummer (The Tennessee Three).
 September 29 — Mac Davis, 78, American singer-songwriter known for many hits such as "In the Ghetto", "Baby, Don't Get Hooked on Me", and "It's Hard to Be Humble" (complications from heart bypass surgery)
 October 7 — Ray Pennington, 86, American singer-songwriter ("I'm a Ramblin' Man") (house fire)
 October 16 — Johnny Bush, 85, American singer-songwriter ("Whiskey River").
 October 22 – Margie Bowes, 79, American singer
 October 23 — Jerry Jeff Walker, 78, American singer-songwriter ("Mr. Bojangles"), throat cancer.
October 24 — J. T. Corenflos, 56, session guitarist (cancer)
October 28 — Billy Joe Shaver, 81, American singer-songwriter ("I'm Just an Old Chunk of Coal (But I'm Gonna Be a Diamond Someday)" (stroke).
November 13 — Doug Supernaw, 60, American singer-songwriter who netted several 1990s hits ("I Don't Call Him Daddy", "Reno", "Not Enough Hours in the Night"), lung and bladder cancer.
November 23 — Hal Ketchum, 67, American singer-songwriter who scored a string of hits during the 1990s ("Small Town Saturday Night", "Past the Point of Rescue", "Hearts Are Gonna Roll"), dementia.
December 12 — Charley Pride, 86, American singer-songwriter; known as country music's first African-American superstar (“Kiss an Angel Good Mornin’”, “Is Anybody Goin’ to San Antone” and many others), COVID-19.
December 21 — K. T. Oslin, 78, American singer-songwriter who scored a string of hits during the late 1980s and early 90's ("80's Ladies", "I'll Always Come Back", "Do Ya" and others), Parkinson's disease and COVID-19.
December 25 — Tony Rice, 69, American guitarist and bluegrass singer and member of the New South and Bluegrass Album Band known for his elegant flatpicking style.
December 29 — Hugh X. Lewis, 90, American singer-songwriter.

Hall of Fame inductees

Bluegrass Hall of Fame 
J. T. Gray - owner of the Station Inn in Nashville which opened in 1974 and noted as one of the best bluegrass venue in the world
Johnson Mountain Boys - a popular group in the 1980s known for their neotraditional style
New Grass Revival - progressive band that produced many of the genres most respected musicians

Country Music Hall of Fame 
(presented on November 21, 2021)

Dean Dillon, songwriter known for his work with George Strait and songs by other artists such as "Tennessee Whiskey", "Set 'Em Up Joe", "Is It Raining at Your House" and "Spilled Perfume".
Marty Stuart, singer-songwriter, musician, television host and country music historian with hits including "Hillbilly Rock" and "The Whiskey Ain't Workin'".
Hank Williams Jr., singer-songwriter and musician known for hits such as "All My Rowdy Friends Are Coming Over Tonight", "A Country Boy Can Survive" and "Family Tradition".

Major awards

Academy of Country Music Awards 
(presented on April 18, 2021)

Entertainer of the Year –  Luke Bryan
 Male Artist of the Year – Thomas Rhett
 Female Artist of the Year – Maren Morris
 Group of the Year – Old Dominion
 Duo of the Year – Dan + Shay
New Male Artist of the Year – Jimmie Allen
New Female Artist of the Year – Gabby Barrett
 Songwriter of the Year – Hillary Lindsey
 Single of the Year – "I Hope You're Happy Now" (Carly Pearce and Lee Brice)
 Song of the Year – "The Bones" (Jimmy Robbins, Maren Morris, Laura Veltz)
 Album of the Year – Starting Over (Chris Stapleton)
 Musical Event of the Year –  "I Hope You're Happy Now" (Carly Pearce and Lee Brice)
 Video of the Year – "Worldwide Beautiful" (Kane Brown)

Americana Music Honors & Awards

American Music Awards 
(presented on November 22, 2020)

Favorite Country Album – Fully Loaded: God's Country (Blake Shelton
Favorite Country Song – "10,000 Hours" (Dan + Shay featuring Justin Bieber)
Favorite Male Country Artist – Kane Brown
Favorite Female Country Artist – Maren Morris
Favorite Country Duo/Group –  Dan + Shay

ARIA Awards 
(presented on November 25, 2020)
Best Country Album - Fallow (Fanny Lumsden)

Billboard Music Awards
(presented on October 14, 2020)
Top Country Artist – Luke Combs
Top Country Male Artist – Luke Combs
Top Country Female Artist – Maren Morris
Top Country Duo/Group – Dan + Shay
Top Country Album – What You See Is What You Get (Luke Combs)
Top Country Song – "10,000 Hours" (Dan + Shay and Justin Bieber)
Top Country Tour – George Strait

CMT Music Awards 
(presented on October 21, 2020, in Nashville)

 Video of the Year - Carrie Underwood - "Drinking Alone"
 Male Video of the Year - Luke Bryan - "One Margarita"
 Female Video of the Year - Carrie Underwood - "Drinking Alone"
 Breakthrough Video of the Year - Gabby Barrett - "I Hope"
 Group Video of the Year - Old Dominion - "One Man Band"
 Duo Video of the Year - Dan + Shay - "I Should Probably Go to Bed"
 Equal Play Award - Jennifer Nettles

CMT Artists of the Year
 (presented June 3, 2020 in Nashville)
Kelsea Ballerini
Brothers Osborne
Florida Georgia Line
Miranda Lambert
Lady Antebellum
Little Big Town
Thomas Rhett

Country Music Association Awards 
(presented on November 11, 2020)
Entertainer of the Year – Eric Church
Male Vocalist of the Year – Luke Combs
Female Vocalist of the Year – Maren Morris
Vocal Group of the Year – Old Dominion
New Artist of the Year – Morgan Wallen
Vocal Duo of the Year – Dan + Shay
Musician of the Year – Jenee Fleenor (fiddle)
Single of the Year – "The Bones" - Maren Morris
Song of the Year – "The Bones" - Maren Morris, Jimmy Robinson, Laura Veltz
Album of the Year – What You See Is What You Get (Luke Combs)
Musical Event of the Year – "I Hope You're Happy Now" (Carly Pearce and Lee Brice)
Video of the Year – "Bluebird" (Miranda Lambert, directed by Trey Fanjoy)
Willie Nelson Lifetime Achievement Award – Charley Pride
Jeff Walker Global Country Artist Award – Ilse DeLange (The Netherlands)

Grammy Awards 
(presented in Los Angeles on March 14, 2021)
 Best Country Solo Performance – "When My Amy Prays" (Vince Gill)
 Best Country Duo/Group Performance – "10,000 Hours" (Dan + Shay ft. Justin Bieber)
 Best Country Song – "Crowded Table" (Brandi Carlile, Natalie Hemby, Lori McKenna)
 Best Country Album – ''Wildcard (Miranda Lambert)
 Best Bluegrass Album – Home (Billy Strings)
 Best Americana Album – World on the Ground (Sarah Jarosz)
 Best American Roots Performance – "I Remember Everything" (John Prine)
 Best American Roots Song – "I Remember Everything" (Pat McLaughlin and John Prine)
 Best Roots Gospel Album – Celebrating Fisk! (The 150th Anniversary Album) (Fisk Jubilee Singers)

International Bluegrass Music Awards 
(presented on October 1, 2020)
 Entertainer of the Year – Sister Sadie
 Male Vocalist of the Year – Danny Paisley
 Female Vocalist of the Year – Brooke Aldridge
 Vocal Group of the Year – Sister Sadie
 Instrumental Group of the Year – Michael Cleveland and Flamekeeper
 New Artist of the Year – Mile Twelve
 Guitar Player of the Year – Jake Workman
 Banjo Player of the Year – Scott Vestal
 Mandolin Player of the Year – Alan Bibey
 Fiddle Player of the Year – Deanie Richardson
 Bass Player of the Year – Missy Raines
 Dobro Player of the Year – Justin Moses
 Album of the Year – Live in Prague (Doyle Lawson and Quicksilver)
 Song of the Year – "Chicago Barn Dance" (Alison Brown, Becky Buller, Missy Raines)
 Collaborative Recording of the Year – "The Barber's Fiddle" (Becky Buller with Shawn Camp, Jason Carter, Laurie Lewis, Kati Penn, Sam Bush, Michael Cleveland, Johnny Warren, Stuart Duncan, Deanie Richardson, Bronwyn Keith-Hynes, Jason Barie, Fred Carpenter, Tyler Andal, Nate Lee, Dan Boner, Brian Christianson, and Laura Orshaw
 Instrumental Recorded Performance of the Year – "Tall Fidler" (Michael Cleveland and Tommy Emmanuel)
 Gospel Recorded Performance of the Year – "Gonna Rise and Shine" (Alan Bibey and Grasstowne)

Juno Awards 
(presented on June 6, 2021 in Toronto)
Country Album of the Year - The Lemonade Stand (Tenille Townes)

References

Country
Country music by year
Culture-related timelines by year